The 1866–67 United States House of Representatives elections were held on various dates in various states between June 4, 1866 and September 6, 1867. They occurred during President Andrew Johnson's term just one year after the American Civil War ended when the Union defeated the Confederacy. Each state set its own date for its elections to the House of Representatives. Members were elected before or after the first session of the 40th United States Congress convened on March 4, 1867, including the at-large seat from the new state of Nebraska. Ten secessionist states still had not yet been readmitted, and therefore were not seated.

The 1866 elections were a decisive event in the early Reconstruction era, in which President Johnson faced off against the Radical Republicans in a bitter dispute over whether Reconstruction should be lenient or harsh toward the vanquished white South.

Most of the congressmen from the former Confederate states were either prevented from leaving the state or were arrested on the way to the capital. A Congress consisting of mostly Radical Republicans sat early in the Capitol and aside from the delegation from Tennessee who were allowed in, the few Southern Congressmen who arrived were not seated.

Background
Johnson, a War Democrat, had been elected Vice President in the 1864 presidential election as the running mate of Abraham Lincoln, a Republican. (The Republicans had chosen not to re-nominate Hannibal Hamlin for a second term as vice president).

Lincoln and Johnson ran together under the banner of the National Union Party, which brought together Republicans (with the exception of some hard-line abolitionist Radical Republicans who backed John C. Frémont, who eventually dropped out of the race after brokering a deal with Lincoln) and the War Democrats (the minority of Democrats who backed Lincoln's prosecution of the war, as opposed to the Peace Democrats, or Copperheads, who favored a negotiated settlement with the Confederates).

After the assassination of Lincoln, Johnson became president. He immediately became embroiled in a dispute with the Radical Republicans over the conditions of Reconstruction; Johnson favored a lenient Reconstruction, while Radical Republicans wanted to continue the military occupation of the South and force Southern states to give freedmen (the newly freed slaves) civil rights (and the right to vote).

Campaign and results
Johnson stumped the country in a public speaking tour known as the Swing Around the Circle; he generally supported Democrats but his speeches were poorly received.

The Republicans won in a landslide, capturing enough seats to override Johnson's vetoes. Only the border states of Delaware, Maryland, and Kentucky voted for Democrats. Recently Reconstructed Tennessee sent a Republican delegation. The other 10 ex-Confederate states did not vote. As a percentage of the total number of seats available in the House of Representatives, the Republican majority attained in the election of 1866 has never been exceeded in any subsequent Congress. The Democratic Party was able to achieve similar success only in the political environment of the era of the Great Depression in the 1930s.

Election summaries
Seven secessionist states were readmitted during this Congress, filling 32 vacancies, but are not included in this table if they were not elected within 1866 through 1867.

The party affiliations of the 4 Representatives elected in Texas's rejected elections are unknown.

Special elections

39th Congress 

|-
! 
| Lovell Rousseau
|  | Unconditional Unionist
| 1865
|  | Incumbent resigned July 21, 1866 following his assault of Josiah Grinnell.Incumbent  re-elected September 15, 1866.Unconditional Unionist hold.
| nowrap | 

|-
! 
| Green C. Smith
|  | Unconditional Unionist
| 1861
|  | Incumbent resigned July 13, 1866 to become Governor of Montana Territory.New member elected September 15, 1866.Democratic gain.
| nowrap | 

|-
! 
| Henry Grider
| 
| 1861
|  | Incumbent died September 7, 1866.New member elected October 6, 1866.Democratic hold.
| nowrap | 

|-
! 
| James Humphrey
| 
| 1864
|  | Incumbent died June 16, 1866.New member elected November 6, 1866.Democratic gain.
| nowrap | 

|}

40th Congress 

|-
! 
| Elijah Hise
| 
| 1866 
|  | Incumbent died May 6, 1867.New member elected August 5, 1867.Democratic hold.
| nowrap | 

|-
! 
| Rutherford B. Hayes
| 
| 1864
|  | Incumbent resigned July 20, 1867 to run for Governor of Ohio.New member elected October 8, 1867.Independent Republican gain.
| nowrap | 

|-
! 
| Charles Denison
| 
| 1862
|  | Incumbent died June 27, 1867.New member elected October 8, 1867.Democratic hold.
| nowrap | 

|-
! 
| Thomas E. Noell
| 
| 1864
|  | Incumbent died October 3, 1867.New member elected November 5, 1867.Democratic hold.
| nowrap | 

|-
! 
| Roscoe Conkling
| 
| 1864
|  | Incumbent resigned March 3, 1867 when elected U.S. senator.New member elected November 5, 1867.Republican hold.
| nowrap | 

|}

California 

|-
! 
| Donald C. McRuer
|  | Republican
| 1864
|  | Incumbent retired.New member elected.Democratic gain.
| nowrap | 

|-
! 
| William Higby
|  | Republican
| 1863
| Incumbent re-elected.
| nowrap | 

|-
! 
| John Bidwell
|  | Republican
| 1864
|  | Incumbent retired.New member elected.Democratic gain.
| nowrap | 

|}

Colorado Territory 
See non-voting delegates, below.

Connecticut

Dakota Territory 
See non-voting delegates, below.

Delaware

Idaho Territory 
See non-voting delegates, below.

Illinois

Indiana

Iowa

Kansas

Kentucky

Maine

Maryland

Massachusetts 

|-
! 
| Thomas D. Eliot
|  | Republican
| 1858
| Incumbent re-elected.
| nowrap | 

|-
! 
| Oakes Ames
|  | Republican
| 1862
| Incumbent re-elected.
| nowrap | 

|-
! 
| Alexander H. Rice
|  | Republican
| 1858
|  |Incumbent retired.New member elected.Republican hold.
| nowrap | 

|-
! 
| Samuel Hooper
|  | Republican
| 1861 (special)
| Incumbent re-elected.
| nowrap | 

|-
! 
| John B. Alley
|  | Republican
| 1858
|  |Incumbent retired.New member elected.Republican hold.
| nowrap | 

|-
! 
| Nathaniel P. Banks
|  | Republican
| 1865 (special)
| Incumbent re-elected.
| nowrap | 

|-
! 
| George S. Boutwell
|  | Republican
| 1862
| Incumbent re-elected.
| nowrap | 
|-
! 
| John D. Baldwin
|  | Republican
| 1862
| Incumbent re-elected.
| nowrap | 

|-
! 
| William B. Washburn
|  | Republican
| 1862
| Incumbent re-elected.
| nowrap | 

|-
! 
| Henry Laurens Dawes
|  | Republican
| 1856
| Incumbent re-elected.
| nowrap | 

|}

Michigan

Minnesota

Missouri

Montana Territory 
See non-voting delegates, below.

Nebraska  

There were two elections in the new state of Nebraska in 1866: on June 6 for the remainder of the current term, and October 9 for the next term.

39th Congress 

|-
! 
| colspan=3 | New state
|  | New seat.New member elected.Republican gain.New member seated March 2, 1867.
| nowrap | 

|}

40th Congress 

|-
! 
| Turner M. Marquett
|  | Republican 
| 1866
|  | Incumbent retired.New member elected.Republican hold.
| nowrap | 

|}

Nevada

New Hampshire

New Jersey

New Mexico Territory 
See non-voting delegates, below.

New York

Ohio 

Democrats gained one seat this election in Ohio. It was later contested and awarded to the Republican for a net gain of zero.

|-
! 
| Benjamin Eggleston
|  | Republican
| 1864
| Incumbent re-elected.
| nowrap | 

|-
! 
| Rutherford B. Hayes
|  | Republican
| 1864
| Incumbent re-elected.
| nowrap | 

|-
! 
| Robert C. Schenck
|  | Republican
| 1862
| Incumbent re-elected.
| nowrap | 

|-
! 
| William Lawrence
|  | Republican
| 1864
| Incumbent re-elected.
| nowrap | 

|-
! 
| Francis C. Le Blond
|  | Democratic
| 1862
|  | Incumbent retired.New member elected.Democratic hold.
| nowrap | 

|-
! 
| Reader W. Clarke
|  | Republican
| 1864
| Incumbent re-elected.
| nowrap | 

|-
! 
| Samuel Shellabarger
|  | Republican
| 1864
| Incumbent re-elected.
| nowrap | 

|-
! 
| James Randolph Hubbell
|  | Republican
| 1864
|  | Incumbent retired.New member elected.Republican hold.
| nowrap | 

|-
! 
| Ralph P. Buckland
|  | Republican
| 1864
| Incumbent re-elected.
| nowrap | 

|-
! 
| James M. Ashley
|  | Republican
| 1862
| Incumbent re-elected.
| nowrap | 

|-
! 
| Hezekiah S. Bundy
|  | Republican
| 1864
|  | Incumbent retired.New member elected.Republican hold.
| nowrap | 

|-
! 
| William E. Finck
|  | Democratic
| 1862
|  | Incumbent retired.New member elected.Democratic hold.
| nowrap | 

|-
! 
| Columbus Delano
|  | Republican
| 1864
|  | Incumbent lost re-electionNew member elected.Democratic gain.
| nowrap | 

|-
! 
| Martin Welker
|  | Republican
| 1864
| Incumbent re-elected.
| nowrap | 

|-
! 
| Tobias A. Plants
|  | Republican
| 1864
| Incumbent re-elected.
| nowrap | 

|-
! 
| John Bingham
|  | Republican
| 1864
| Incumbent re-elected.
| nowrap | 

|-
! 
| Ephraim R. Eckley
|  | Republican
| 1862
| Incumbent re-elected.
| nowrap | 

|-
! 
| Rufus P. Spalding
|  | Republican
| 1862
| Incumbent re-elected.
| nowrap | 

|-
! 
| James A. Garfield
|  | Republican
| 1862
| Incumbent re-elected.
| nowrap | 

|}

Oregon

Pennsylvania

Rhode Island

Tennessee 

Elections held late, on August 1, 1867.

|-
! 
| Nathaniel G. Taylor
|  | Unionist
| 1865
|  |Incumbent retired.New member elected.Republican gain.
| nowrap | 

|-
! 
| Horace Maynard
|  | Unionist
| 1865
|  |Incumbent re-elected.Republican gain.
| nowrap | 

|-
! 
| William B. Stokes
|  | Unionist
| 1865
|  |Incumbent re-elected.Republican gain.
| nowrap | 

|-
! 
| Edmund Cooper
|  | Unionist
| 1865
|  |Incumbent lost re-election.New member elected.Republican gain.
|  nowrap | 

|-
! 
| William B. Campbell
|  | Unionist
| 1865
|  |Incumbent retired.New member elected.Republican gain.
| nowrap | 

|-
! 
| Samuel M. Arnell
|  | Unionist
| 1865
|  |Incumbent re-elected.Republican gain.
|  

|-
! 
| Isaac R. Hawkins
|  | Unionist
| 1865
|  |Incumbent re-elected.Republican gain.
| nowrap | 

|-
! 
| John W. Leftwich
|  | Unionist
| 1865
|  |Incumbent lost re-election.New member elected.Republican gain.
| nowrap | 

|}

Utah Territory 
See non-voting delegates, below.

Vermont

Washington Territory 
See non-voting delegates, below.

West Virginia 

|-
! 
| Chester D. Hubbard
|  | Unconditional Unionist
| 1864
|  | Incumbent re-elected.Republican gain.
| nowrap | 

|-
! 
| George R. Latham
|  | Unconditional Unionist
| 1864
|  | Incumbent retired.New member elected.Republican gain.
| nowrap | 

|-
! 
| Kellian Whaley
|  | Unconditional Unionist
| 1863
|  | Incumbent retired.New member elected.Republican gain.
| nowrap | 

|}

Wisconsin

Wisconsin elected six members of congress on Election Day, November 4, 1866.

|-
! 
| Halbert E. Paine
|  | National Union
| 1864
|  | Incumbent won re-election as a Republican.Republican hold.
| nowrap | 

|-
! 
| Ithamar Sloan
|  | National Union
| 1862
|  | Incumbent was not a candidate for re-election.New member elected.Republican hold.
| nowrap | 

|-
! 
| Amasa Cobb
|  | National Union
| 1862
|  | Incumbent won re-election as a Republican.Republican hold.
| nowrap | 

|-
! 
| Charles A. Eldredge
|  | Democratic
| 1862
| Incumbent re-elected.
| nowrap | 

|-
! 
| Philetus Sawyer
|  | National Union
| 1864
|  | Incumbent won re-election as a Republican.Republican hold.
| nowrap | 

|-
! 
| Walter D. McIndoe
|  | National Union
| 1862 
|  | Incumbent was not a candidate for re-election.New member elected.Republican hold.
| nowrap | 

|}

Non-voting delegates 

|-
! 

|-
! 

|-
! 
| Edward D. Holbrook
|  | Democratic
| 1864
| Incumbent re-elected.
| nowrap | 

|-
! 
| Samuel McLean
|  | Democratic
| 1864
|  | Incumbent retired.New delegate elected.Democratic hold.
| nowrap | 

|-
! 

|-
! 

|-
! 

|}

See also
 1866 United States elections
 1866–67 United States Senate elections
 39th United States Congress
 40th United States Congress

Notes

References

Bibliography
 
 
 
 , large collection of speeches and primary documents, 1865–1870, complete text online (the copyright has expired)

External links
 Office of the Historian (Office of Art & Archives, Office of the Clerk, U.S. House of Representatives)